The Wasabi Special is a Formula One racing aircraft.

Development
The Wasabi Special is a single place, low-wing, conventional landing gear-equipped racing aircraft.

The airplane was designed and built at the Mojave Air and Spaceport by Elliot Seguin for racing and record setting.

Operational history
Reno Air Races
2013-229 mph
EAA Airventure
Set C1-a record for MHV to OSH flying non-stop with 5 other experimental aircraft from Mojave.
Reno Air Races
2014-235 mph

Specifications (Wasabi Special)

References

Further reading
Aerochia_LT-1
Owl_Racer_OR65-2
Cassutt_Special
Sharp Nemesis NXT
Lancair_Legacy

External links
Flight Test Video

Racing aircraft